Latro may refer to:

 Marcus Porcius Latro (died 4 BC), a Roman rhetorician 
 Latro of Laon (c. 499 AD—570 AD), saint and bishop
 Latro, protagonist of Gene Wolfe's novel Soldier of the Mist and its sequels

See also

 Latrocinium, a war not preceded by a formal declaration of war as understood in Roman law